Petrophile latericola is a species of flowering plant in the family Proteaceae and is endemic to southwestern Western Australia. It is an erect shrub with needle-shaped leaves and spherical heads of bright yellow flowers.

Description
The flowers are arranged on the ends of branchlets in sessile, more or less spherical heads with fifteen to thirty-five flowers.

Taxonomy
Petrophile latericola was first formally described in 2010 by Gregory John Keighery in The Western Australian Naturalist from specimens he collected in the Whicher escarpment in 1990. The specific epithet (latericola) means "associated with laterite".

Distribution and habitat
This petrophile grows in heath and shrubland along the base of the Whicher Range in the Swan Coastal Plain biogeographic region in the southwest of Western Australia.

Conservation status
This petrophile is classified as "Threatened Flora (Declared Rare Flora — Extant)" by the Department of Environment and Conservation (Western Australia).

Cultural references
In 2019 Australia Post featured Petrophile latericola on a postage stamp.

References

latericola
Eudicots of Western Australia
Endemic flora of Western Australia
Plants described in 2010
Taxa named by Gregory John Keighery